Lewis and Clark Community College is a public community college in Godfrey, Illinois. It serves approximately 15,000 credit and non-credit students annually. The college has nine locations throughout the St. Louis Metro East, including a campus and humanities center in Edwardsville, Illinois; community education centers in Alton, Illinois, Carlinville, Illinois and Jerseyville, Illinois; a training center in Bethalto, Illinois; a river research center in East Alton, Illinois; and a location at the East St. Louis Higher Education Center in East St. Louis, Illinois. Lewis and Clark has career and transfer study options. The college also offers personal enrichment programming for adults and children, as well as corporate and safety training options for professionals.

Campuses
The main campus is in Godfrey, Illinois on the grounds of the former Monticello College, a women's seminary established in 1838. In 1970, the newly-established Lewis and Clark Community College District purchased the grounds, buildings and faculty. L&C began offering classes in 1970. Many of the original buildings are still used, and a gymnasium, math and science complex, nursing building and welding facility have been added since. The N.O. Nelson campus (named after N.O. Nelson, founder of the village of Leclaire, Illinois) is located in Edwardsville, Illinois.

Two floors of the main complex were closed in September of 2021 because of maintenance issues. The school is currently waiting on the state to release $37.5 million in Capital Project Funds (which were allocated in 2019, but have yet to be released) to begin much-needed renovations.

Academics
Lewis and Clark is the first and only community college campus to operate a nurse managed intercollaborative practice clinic to help underserved members of the community receive affordable healthcare. The Lewis and Clark Family Health Clinic was named one of three national winners of the 2010 MetLife Foundation Community College Excellence Award, along with a $50,000 grant, in the spring of 2010.

In October 2010, the college, in conjunction with the National Great Rivers Research and Education Center, the University of Illinois and the Illinois Natural History Survey dedicated a river research facility, the Jerry F. Costello Confluence Field Station, along the Mississippi River.

Athletics
Lewis and Clark Community College competes as member of the NJCAA in the Mid-West Athletic Conference. The athletics teams - men and women's soccer, men and women's basketball, men and women's tennis, volleyball, golf, softball and baseball - are referred to as the Trailblazers.

Championships:
 In 1999, the Lewis and Clark Community College Women's Soccer Team won a NJCAA National Championship after they defeated Champlain, 3-1. In 2008, the Lewis and Clark Community College Women’s Soccer Team defeated the No. 1 seed, Darton College 3-2 to win the NJCAA National Championship.

Sustainability 
Lewis and Clark has made a commitment to<"going green," through signed agreements with the American College and University Presidents Climate Commitment, the Illinois Green Economy Network, the Illinois Sustainable University Commitment, the St. Louis Higher Education Sustainability Consortium, and through various efforts on campus including energy efficient lighting, composting and sustainable landscaping, among others.ref></ref>

Awards 
 Green Roof Award, NGRREC (2010)
 U.S. Water Prize (2011)
 Illinois Governor’s Sustainability Award (2011, 2013, 2016)
 Illinois Governor’s Sustainability Compact, Gold Level (2012)

Notable people
 Dale T. Chapman, former president of Lewis and Clark Community College.

Notable alumni
 Barb Honchak - professional Mixed Martial Artist, inaugural Invicta FC Flyweight Champion, currently competing in the UFC
 Jason Isringhausen - Former closer for the St. Louis Cardinals

References

External links
Official website

Community colleges in Illinois
Universities and colleges in Madison County, Illinois
Educational institutions established in 1970
1970 establishments in Illinois
NJCAA athletics